was a Japanese daimyō during the Azuchi–Momoyama and Edo periods. A native of Mikawa Province, Kiyonaga served the Tokugawa clan during its battles, until 1600. he was one of Ieyasu's "three magistrates" (san-bugyō).

Biography
Born in Mikawa, Kiyonaga first served Tokugawa Ieyasu in 1552. In Mikawa, he served as one of Ieyasu's three magistrates (san-bugyō), together with Amano Yasukage and Honda Shigetsugu. Yasukage was known for his patience, Shigetsugu for his fortitude, and Kiyonaga for his leniency; this leniency earned him the nickname of "Buddha Kōriki" (Hotoke Kōriki 仏高力).

Kiyonaga was also active in various battles including Siege of Terabe 1558 and also Siege of Marune 1560. He transported provisions to Ōtaka Castle at the Battle of Okehazama 1560. He helped suppress the Ikkō-ikki of Mikawa Province including Battle of Batogahara 1564, joined in the pacification of Tōtōmi Province at Siege of Kakegawa 1569, and took part in the Battle of Komaki and Nagakute 1584. Kiyonaga also assisted with ship construction for the Seven-Year War (1592-1598).

Kiyonaga became a daimyō in 1590, when he was granted the 20,000 koku fief of Iwatsuki. As he was preceded in death by his son Masanaga, Kiyonaga retired after the Sekigahara, and passed down family headship to his grandson Tadafusa.

References
  Japanese Wikipedia article on Kōriki Kiyonaga

1530 births
1608 deaths
Daimyo
Samurai
People from Aichi Prefecture